Norma Doggett (August 3, 1925 – May 4, 2020) was an American dancer and actress.

Doggett began her career as a dancer, performing in the Chez Paree Club's ensemble in Chicago. She later worked at the Blackhawk Club.

Doggett's Broadway credits included Bells Are Ringing (1956), Fanny (1954), Wish You Were Here (1952), Miss Liberty (1949), All for Love (1949), and Magdalena (1948-1948).

Her films included Seven Brides for Seven Brothers (1954).

References

External links
https://www.imdb.com/name/nm0230497/

1925 births
2020 deaths
Actresses from Chicago
People from Forest Hills, Queens
American female dancers
20th-century American actresses
American stage actresses
21st-century American women